Lowther is a civil parish in the Eden District, Cumbria, England.  It contains 42 listed buildings that are recorded in the National Heritage List for England.  Of these, 13 are listed at Grade II*, the middle of the three grades, and the others are at Grade II, the lowest grade.  The parish contains the villages of Lowther, Newtown, Hackthorpe, Melkinthorpe, and Whale.  The largest building in the parish is Lowther Castle, a country house in the form of a sham castle. which is now in ruins; this and associated structures are listed.  In the 1760s a model village was created, the buildings designed by Robert Adam, but was never completed; the existing buildings are all listed.   Most of the other listed buildings are houses and associated structures, farmhouses and farm buildings.  The other listed buildings include a church an item in the churchyard, a public house, two bridges, and a milestone.


Key

Buildings

References

Citations

Sources

Lists of listed buildings in Cumbria